The Kerichawa Valley Tuff series is a group of pumice-rich trachytic tuffs and agglomerates. They are younger than the Nairobi Trachyte, found in Nairobi as part of the sediments that were deposited due to formation of the Rift valley.

References

Geologic formations of Kenya